Charlie Adams (born May 8, 1954) is an American drummer, best known for playing in Yanni's touring band, after having played with Yanni in the early 1980s rock band Chameleon. Adams was born in Joliet, Illinois.

Music career

Chameleon
Band members of regional rock band Chameleon included Adams on drums, vocals, and percussion; Yanni on keyboards and synthesizers; Dugan McNeill on lead vocals and bass guitars; Johnny Donaldson on all guitars; and Mark Anthony on lead vocals and keyboards. Their albums included Chameleon, Techno-color, Hologram Sky, and Balance. The group was noted for Adams' revolving gyroscope drum kit, who played his rapidly spinning drums before Mötley Crüe's Tommy Lee's similar arrangement.

Yanni
In 1987, Yanni formed his first touring band to promote his album Out of Silence, as well as selections from Keys to Imagination. This early band included Yanni, John Tesh and Joyce Imbesi on keyboards, and Adams on drums. He is also featured in both Live at the Acropolis released in 1994 and Live at Royal Albert Hall released in 1995.

Adams did not join the Tribute concert at the Taj Mahal and Forbidden City as he had to help raise his son with autism issues and thus was replaced by rock/jazz drummer Joel Taylor for the entire tour. After Yanni's hiatus following Tribute, Adams returned in 2001.

Adams reunited again with Yanni for the 2003/2004 Ethnicity concert tour.

Discography
Adams is credited as drummer or percussionist in the following albums, produced by Yanni unless otherwise noted.

Influences
Adams has indicated his musical influences to include Buddy Rich, the Beatles, Emerson, Lake and Palmer, Black Sabbath and Led Zeppelin.

References

External links

 
 
 Charlie Adams at Drummer World.com
 Chameleon at MusicMight.com
 

American male drummers
American percussionists
Musicians from Joliet, Illinois
Musicians from Nashville, Tennessee
Living people
1954 births
20th-century American drummers
21st-century American drummers
20th-century American male musicians
21st-century American male musicians